Samuel Conn is the name of:

Sammy Conn (born 1961), Scottish footballer